David Michael Brown (born 1956) is an Australian musician, who has played bass guitar or guitar in a series of improvisatory ensembles since 1978. His solo material is issued under the name, Candlesnuffer.

Biography 

David Brown was born in 1956 and raised in Melbourne, Australia.

In 1978 David Tolley, Brown's teacher, formed False Start with the aid of funding from the Music Board of the Australia Council. False Start had Brown on bass guitar and guitar, and included Tolley on drums and percussion, James Clayden on vocals and Dure Dara on percussion. From 1978 to 1983, Brown also played guitar and percussion in Signals, with David Wadelton, Chris Knowles, and Philip Thomson. Signals performed at the Clifton Hill Community Music Centre and La Mama Theatre, as well as art exhibitions (such as the Biennale of Sydney) and galleries. In 1983, Brown played bass guitar with Jamie Fielding and Philip Thomson as Skeleton. From 1983 to 1985 he performed in Mulch, with Mark Ewenson and Tom Fielding. From 1985 to 1987, Brown played in Ultratune with Robert Corbett and Terry McDermott.

In 1987, Brown joined Dumb And The Ugly with Michael Sheridan and John Murphy. In 1992, he formed Bucketrider, a jazz / heavy metal group, with Sean Baxter, Tim O'Dwyer, Adam Simmons, and James Wilkinson. In 1995, Brown and Sean Baxter formed a duo called Lazy. In 1996 he formed a trio with Sean Baxter and KK Null called Terminal Hz. In 1996 he also performed in The Crowded Foxhole with Louis Peake, Sean Baxter, and Tim O'Dwyer. Brown also releases solo work under the moniker Candlesnuffer.

Brown has performed at numerous festivals and exhibitions, such as What Is Music, Next Wave, and Cinesonic.

Reception

External links

 

Living people
1956 births
Australian guitarists
Musicians from Melbourne